Ashland is an 'L' station on the CTA's Green and Pink Lines. It is an elevated station with two side platforms, located in Chicago's Near West Side neighborhood at 1601 West Lake Street. Just to the west of the station, the Pink Line branches off from the Lake Street branch to follow the Paulina Connector to the Douglas branch.

History
Ashland station opened on November 6, 1893, as part of the Lake Street Elevated Railroad's initial route, and it is one of the oldest standing stations on the 'L'.  The station closed on April 4, 1948, along with nine other stations on the Lake Street branch, but later reopened on February 25, 1951, the same day the Milwaukee-Dearborn subway opened for service. During the two-year closure of the Green Line from 1994 to 1996, the station was restored and elevators were added to make the station ADA compliant.

Structure and location
Ashland is the closest 'L' station to the United Center, the home stadium of the Chicago Bulls NBA team and the Chicago Blackhawks NHL team. It is also directly adjacent to Union Park, venue for the Intonation Music Festival and the Pitchfork Music Festival.

Bus connections
CTA
  9 Ashland (Owl Service) 
  X9 Ashland Express (Weekday Rush Hours only)

See also
Ashland (CTA Orange Line station)
Ashland/63rd (CTA station)

Notes and references

Notes

References

External links

Ashland Avenue entrance from Google Maps Street View
Justine Street entrance from Google Maps Street View

CTA Green Line stations
CTA Pink Line stations
Railway stations in the United States opened in 1893
1893 establishments in Illinois
Chicago Blackhawks
Chicago Bulls